Jean-Baptiste Azéma was a French administrator; he served as the governor of Réunion from May 15 to October 31, 1745.  His son was the writer Étienne Azéma; other descendants have included Georges Azéma, a historian; Mazaé Azéma, a doctor; Henri Azéma, a doctor; poet Jean-Henri Azéma; and historian Jean-Pierre Azéma.

References
Les Gouverneurs de La Réunion. Ancienne île de La Réunion, Raoul Lucas et Mario Serviable, Éditions du Centre de recherche indianocéanique, Sainte-Clotilde, 1987.

French colonial governors and administrators
People of French descent from Réunion
18th-century French politicians
Year of birth missing
Year of death missing